The 1987 Milwaukee Brewers season featured the team finish in third place in the American League East, with a record of 91 wins and 71 losses. The team began the season at a red-hot pace, winning their first 13 games under first-year manager Tom Trebelhorn before losing 12 games in a row in May. Other highlights included Paul Molitor capturing the imaginations of Milwaukee fans with a 39-game hitting streak and Juan Nieves tossing the first no-hitter in Brewers history on April 15 with a 7-0 blanking of the Baltimore Orioles.

Offseason
 December 10, 1986: Tim Leary and Tim Crews were traded by the Brewers to the Los Angeles Dodgers for Greg Brock.

Regular season

Season standings

Record vs. opponents

Notable transactions
 June 2, 1987: 1987 Major League Baseball draft
Brian Turang was drafted by the Brewers in the 20th round, but did not sign.
Mark Kiefer was drafted by the Brewers in the 21st round.
 June 15, 1987: Jim Morris was released by the Brewers.
 June 29, 1987: Russ McGinnis was traded by the Brewers to the Oakland Athletics for Bill Mooneyham.
 July 16, 1987: Skeeter Barnes was purchased by the Brewers from the St. Louis Cardinals.
 July 30, 1987: Ray Burris was signed as a free agent by the Brewers.

Roster

Player stats

Batting

Starters by position
Note: Pos = Position; G = Games played; AB = At bats; H = Hits; Avg. = Batting average; HR = Home runs; RBI = Runs batted in

Other batters
Note: G = Games played; AB = At bats; H = Hits; Avg. = Batting average; HR = Home runs; RBI = Runs batted in

Pitching

Starting pitchers 
Note: G = Games pitched; IP = Innings pitched; W = Wins; L = Losses; ERA = Earned run average; SO = Strikeouts

Other pitchers 
Note: G = Games pitched; IP = Innings pitched; W = Wins; L = Losses; ERA = Earned run average; SO = Strikeouts

Relief pitchers 
Note: G = Games pitched; W = Wins; L = Losses; SV = Saves; ERA = Earned run average; SO = Strikeouts

Awards and honors
Paul Molitor, Hutch Award

Farm system

The Brewers' farm system consisted of five minor league affiliates in 1987.

Notes

References
1987 Milwaukee Brewers team at Baseball-Reference
1987 Milwaukee Brewers team page at www.baseball-almanac.com

Milwaukee Brewers seasons
Milwaukee Brewers season
Mil